"Suegra" (English: "Mother-in-law") is a song by American singer Romeo Santos. It is the eighth single for Santos' fifth studio album Formula, Vol. 3 (2022). The music video was released on March 3, 2023. It features Santos paying homage to the late Dominican comedian Luisito Martí, who was known for his iconic portrayal of Balbuena, alongside first actress Cecilia García as the titular mother-in-law, as well as the special participation of urban singer Bulin 47 and Leli Hernández as Santos' girlfriend.

Controversy 
On February 27, 2023, at the same time that Santos teased the video on his Instagram account to celebrate the Independence Day, politician and lawyer Víctor Pavón submitted an instance before the National Commission of Public Entertainment and Radiophony, demanding that the song be banned from the local radio stations, strongly arguing that its lyrics promote violence against women and violate the Republic's Constitution in various articles and Dominican laws. On March 3, Pavón's request was granted and the Commission officially banned the song from the stations, with the politician congratulating the entity for their diligence. Santos responded by releasing the video, which was shot in September 2022, on his YouTube channel, stating that he did not arrange for it to be released around this time, but the song's ban forced him to push his plans forward.

Charts

References 

2023 singles
2022 songs
Romeo Santos songs
Sony Music Latin singles
Songs written by Romeo Santos
Bachata songs
Spanish-language songs